Menogaril is an anthracycline analog of nogalamycin which was developed in late 1970s. It has even stronger anticancer activity than nogalamycin and has less toxicity than nogalamycin. However, its development for clinical use was cancelled due to only moderate success with relatively high incidence of serious toxicity (43-44% in non-Hodgkin's lymphoma patients).

References 

Anthracyclines